The NordWestBahn GmbH is a private railway company providing regional train services on several routes in northern and western Germany. It is a joint venture of Stadtwerke Osnabrück AG, Verkehr und Wasser GmbH in Oldenburg and Transdev Germany, Berlin. The head office of the company is in Osnabrück. NWB claims to be Germany's largest regional railway company.

Since 5 November 2000, NordWestBahn operates, on behalf of the public transport company of Lower Saxony (Landesnahverkehrsgesellschaft Niedersachsen - LNVG), the Weser-Ems-Network in Lower Saxony. In March 2008, NordWestBahn won the tender for the regional S-Bahn Bremen/Lower Saxony, defeating German National railway operator DB Regio. Operation of these routes started in December 2010.

The routes that NordWestBahn operate in the Rhein-Ruhr area will split from the business to a separate company called Transdev RheinRuhr (branded as RheinRuhrBahn) as of the 1st September.

Services

Fleet

Depots
NordWestBahn has five depots to maintain its fleet. These are at Osnabrück, Dorsten, Mettmann (operated by RegioBahn), Bremerhaven and Kleve.

References

External links

Railway companies of Germany
Transdev
Railway companies established in 1992
German companies established in 1992